Samo is a small town and comune located in the Province of Reggio Calabria, southern Italy. Samo has a population of 1,090 but this increases seasonally. It is located at the foot of Aspromonte National Park.

Samo has a number of fresh water springs running in the nearby mountains and through the town which are used by most of the population for drinking.

History

Samo has been historically a city of much trade and import. From the 16th century onwards, people would trade sheepskins, lambs and pineapple.

Main sights
The main attractions of Samo are the ruins of the old town destroyed in the 1908 Messina earthquake and hiking in the nearby Aspromonte National Park.

Sport
The town has a football team called AC Samo and is currently playing in the lower regional divisions.

Twin towns
Samo is the sister town of the Greek island of Samos.

Notes

External links
 Comune di Samo
 Tuttosamo.it